Moronobea is a plant genus of the family Clusiaceae. They are glabrous medium to large trees with yellow latex. The genus comprises 7 species, native to South America, 5 of which are in Venezuela. It is related to Platonia and Montrouziera.

The resinous latex of Moronobea coccinea and Moronobea riparia has been widely used by Amerindians for caulking, as a mastic, and burned as a source of light.

References

Clusiaceae
Malpighiales genera